James Edward Jenkins (March 15, 1923 – April 23, 2002), nicknamed "Pee Wee", was an American Negro league pitcher in the 1940s and 1950s. He played for the Indianapolis Clowns, New York Cubans, and Birmingham Black Barons.

A native of Hampden Sydney, Virginia, Jenkins went 2–2 on the mound for the 1947 Negro World Series champion New York Cubans.

Jenkins also pitched in the Provincial League for Three Rivers and in the Mandak League for Winnipeg.

Jenkins died in Farmville, Virginia in 2002 at age 79.

References

External links
 and Seamheads
 Pee Wee Jenkins at Negro Leagues Baseball Museum

1923 births
2002 deaths
Birmingham Black Barons players
Indianapolis Clowns players
New York Cubans players
People from Prince Edward County, Virginia
Baseball players from Virginia
Baseball pitchers
20th-century African-American sportspeople
21st-century African-American people